Rauch Partido is a partido in the centre-east of Buenos Aires Province in Argentina.

Settlements

Rauch: 12.495 inhabitants
Miranda: 80 inhabitants
Egaña: 44 inhabitants
Colman: 27 inhabitants

External links
  municipal site (Spanish)
  federal site (Spanish)

1865 establishments in Argentina
Partidos of Buenos Aires Province